was a  after Chōkan and before Nin'an. This period spanned the years from June 1165 through August 1166.

Change of era
 February 13, 1165 : The new era name was created to mark an event or series of events. The previous era ended and a new one commenced in Chōkan 3, on the 5th day of the 6th month in the year 1165.

Events of the Eiman era
 1165 (Eiman 1):  The infant son of Emperor Nijō was named heir apparent; and this Crown Prince will soon become Emperor Rokujō.
 August 3, 1165 (Eiman 1, 25th day of the 6th month): In the 7th year of Emperor Nijō's reign (桓武天皇7年), the emperor fell so very ill that he abdicated, and the succession (senso) was received by his son. Shortly thereafter, Emperor Rokujō is said to have acceded to the throne (sokui).
 September 4, 1165 (Eiman 1, 27th day of the 7th month): The former-Emperor Nijō died at age 22.

Notes

References
 Brown, Delmer M. and Ichirō Ishida, eds. (1979).  Gukanshō: The Future and the Past. Berkeley: University of California Press. ;  OCLC 251325323
 Nussbaum, Louis-Frédéric and Käthe Roth. (2005).  Japan encyclopedia. Cambridge: Harvard University Press. ;  OCLC 58053128
 Titsingh, Isaac. (1834). Nihon Odai Ichiran; ou,  Annales des empereurs du Japon.  Paris: Royal Asiatic Society, Oriental Translation Fund of Great Britain and Ireland. OCLC 5850691
 Varley, H. Paul. (1980). A Chronicle of Gods and Sovereigns: Jinnō Shōtōki of Kitabatake Chikafusa. New York: Columbia University Press. ;  OCLC 6042764

External links 
 National Diet Library, "The Japanese Calendar" -- historical overview plus illustrative images from library's collection

Japanese eras
1160s in Japan